Mengue is a surname. Notable people with the surname include:

Albert Mengue (born 1999), Cameroonian boxer
Bruno Ondo Mengue (born 1992), Spanish-born Equatoguinean basketball player
Ntyam Mengue (born 1954), Cameroonian jurist
Vincent Essone Mengue (born 1946), Gabonese politician